Andrei Igorevich Ospeshinskiy (born 26 September 1979) is a former Russian professional footballer.

Club career
He made his professional debut in the Russian Third League in 1996 for FC Smena Moscow.

Honours
 Russian Cup finalist: 2005.

References

1979 births
Footballers from Moscow
Living people
Russian footballers
Association football forwards
FC Saturn Ramenskoye players
Russian Premier League players
FC Elista players
FC Khimki players
FC Luch Vladivostok players